Movistar Team is a professional road bicycle racing team which participates at UCI WorldTeam level and has achieved thirteen general classification (GC) victories in Grand Tours.  The title sponsor is the Spanish mobile telephone company Telefónica, with the team riding under the name of the company's brand Movistar.

The team was formed as Reynolds, led by Ángel Arroyo and later by Pedro Delgado, who won a Tour de France and a Vuelta a España, and was subsequently sponsored by Banesto, under which name the team included 5-time Tour de France winner Miguel Induráin and Alex Zülle, twice winner of the Vuelta a España. The team offices are in Egüés, in Navarre, Spain. A later sponsor was Caisse d'Epargne, a French semi-cooperative banking group.

Having previously used Pinarello bikes, the team rode Canyon frames in 2014, with Campagnolo parts. Since 2008, Eusebio Unzué has been the manager of the team after the long running manager, José Miguel Echavarri, retired from the sport. The directeurs sportifs of the team are José Vicente García, Pablo Lastras, José Luis Jaimerena, Patxi Vila and Max Sciandri.

History

Reynolds (1980–1989)
The team began in 1980 as the Reynolds team which José Miguel Echavarri as the directeur sportif. In 1982 signed a young Pedro Delgado who acted as a domestique for team leader Ángel Arroyo during the 1982 Vuelta a España. Arroyo won the Vuelta after his team controlled the race after he took the lead. But 48 hours after his Vuelta win, the results of a positive test were made known for Methylphenidate (Ritalin). Arroyo and the Reynolds team denied that Arroyo doped and asked for a B-analysis which confirmed the positive A-sample.  Arroyo became the first winner of the Vuelta a España to be disqualified. Delgado changed teams in 1985 but returned to Reynolds in 1988 where he won the 1988 Tour de France and then the 1989 Vuelta a España with the team. In 1984, Miguel Induráin made his professional debut with the team.

Banesto (1990–2003)
In 1990, Spanish bank Banesto took over as the main sponsor of the team from Reynolds. Delgado was the team leader for the Tour de France while Miguel Induráin and Julián Gorospe were the leaders for the week long stage races. When Gorospe took the lead in that year's Vuelta, the team went behind him in a bid to win the race. However Gorospe lost the leader's jersey and Delgado took over the leadership but could not regain the time that Italian Marco Giovannetti had gained and ended the race second overall behind Giovannetti. Over the following years, Indurain rose to become a dominator of stage races winning five editions of the Tour de France and two editions of the Giro d'Italia. Delgado was the team leader for the Vuelta. The team also achieved success with Jean-François Bernard who won the 1992 edition of Paris–Nice with the team. The team won the Vuelta again in 1998 with Abraham Olano. During this time Alex Zülle joined the team and finished the 1999 Tour de France second overall while legendary climber José María Jiménez performed in the Vuelta a España. The team became known as iBanesto.com in the final years of the sponsorship of the Banesto bank.

Illes Balears (2004–2005)
In 2004, Illes Balears, the Balearic Island's Tourism Board, became the team's principal sponsor, the team's name was Illes Balears-Banesto until 2005. Caisse d'Epargne took over from Banesto as the second sponsor in the 2005 season, the team was then known as Illes Balears-Caisse d'Epargne. Caisse d'Epargne then became the main sponsor in 2006 reversing the  title sponsor ordering with the name, Caisse d'Epargne-Illes Balears.

The team fielded a number of strong contenders in the 2005 Tour de France including Francisco Mancebo (former National Champion of Spain), Alejandro Valverde, Vladimir Karpets and sprinter Isaac Gálvez. Mancebo produced the best results finishing fourth overall in the General Classification.

Caisse d'Epargne (2006–2010)
Caisse d'Epargne-Illes Balears finished fifth overall (56 minutes, 53 seconds behind Team T-Mobile) in the Team Classification at the 2006 Tour de France. Individually, the team's top rider, Óscar Pereiro, finished in second place. The Tour victory of Phonak rider Floyd Landis was almost immediately called into question, after a urine sample taken after his Stage 17 win twice tested positive for banned synthetic testosterone as well as a ratio of testosterone to epitestosterone nearly three times the limit allowed by World Anti-Doping Agency rules.

After hearing of the positive "A" test, Pereiro stated that it was only an initial, unconfirmed result and he would not yet consider Landis guilty or himself the Tour winner. "I have too much respect for Landis to do otherwise", he said. After hearing that the Landis "B" test also came back positive, Pereiro stated that he now considers himself Tour champion and the Landis scandal should not diminish his own achievement. "Right now I feel like the winner of the Tour de France", Pereiro said. "It's a victory for the whole team." After nearly two years of appeals, Pereiro was officially upgraded to Tour champion for 2006.

Movistar (2011– )
On 31 May 2010, the Court of Arbitration for Sport upheld the appeals from WADA and the UCI regarding the suspension of Alejandro Valverde for his implication in the Operación Puerto doping case. Valverde was banned for two years, starting 1 January 2010 and after serving the two-year suspension returned to competition in 2012 riding for the Movistar Team.

The 2011 season proved to be a transitional one for the team, with their first victory coming as a single stage win in the Tour Down Under, courtesy of Francisco José Ventoso. The team found success with stage wins in the Volta a Catalunya and Tour of the Basque Country. The team also won two stages of the Giro d'Italia: Ventoso won stage 6 and Vasil Kiryienka won stage 20. The team's final Grand Tour win came courtesy of Rui Costa in the Tour de France.

The 2012 season saw the team re-establish itself as one of the major general classification contenders. The return of Valverde almost immediately brought the team success with a stage win in the Tour Down Under, followed by the overall win of the Vuelta a Andalucía as well as a stage win. Colombian new recruit Nairo Quintana also brought the team overall victory at the Vuelta a Murcia. The team scored multiple overall classification victories; Quintana claimed the Route du Sud, Rui Costa the Tour de Suisse, Javier Moreno the Vuelta a Castilla y León and finally Beñat Intxausti won the  Vuelta a Asturias. The team also won stages in all three Grand Tours.

The 2013 season closely followed the previous years, Valverde scored multiple early season results with the Trofeo Serra de Tramuntana and an overall win in the Vuelta a Andalucía. Quintana further reinforced his potential as a Grand Tour GC rider with the overall win in the Tour of the Basque Country as well as claiming second place in the Tour de France, taking the King of the Mountains in addition to the Young rider classification. He further reinforced his reputation as a force to be reckoned with, with an overall win in the Vuelta a Burgos. Intxausti got the team's final overall win of the year and Costa won the UCI World Road Race championships. For the 2014 season the team confirmed that they would shift from Pinarello bikes to Canyon Bicycles.

For 2014, the team adopted a 'divide and conquer' based tactic for the season's Grand Tours; first sending Quintana to the Giro, Valverde to the Tour and then finally both riders to the Vuelta. Quintana achieved the team's first victory – winning stage 4 of the Tour de San Luis as well as the overall classification, Adriano Malori also won the individual time trial stage. Once again Valverde won the Vuelta a Andalucía as well as the Vuelta a Murcia, Roma Maxima, GP Miguel Induráin and La Flèche Wallonne. In May, Quintana won the team's first Grand Tour since Valverde's 2009 Vuelta victory, the 2014 Giro d'Italia. As with the previous season, Quintana defended his Vuelta a Burgos title winning it for the second straight year.

In August 2014, the team announced the signing of Marc Soler and Rubén Fernández on a 2-year contract.

At the 2015 Tour de France, the team finished first in the teams classification, and the two top men of the team, Nairo Quintana and Alejandro Valverde finished second and third in the general classification, respectively, with Quintana also winning the white jersey as best young rider, and finishing second in the king of the mountains classification.

During the 2016 Tour, the team finished first in the teams classification by 8' 14" over Team Sky. Nairo Quintana made the podium by finishing third overall in the general classification standings and Ion Izagirre claimed victory on stage 20. Later during the 2016 Vuelta a España, Quintana won stage 10 and the overall. The team concluded the year with their fourth win in the team ranking of 2016 UCI World Tour.

In 2019, Richard Carapaz won the Giro d'Italia, and the team won the team classification in all three Grand Tours. The team's season is captured in a documentary series, The Least Expected Day: Inside the Movistar Team 2019, available on Netflix.

Team roster

Major wins

National, continental and world champions

1982
 Spain Road Race José Luis Laguía
1983
 Spain Road Race  Carlos Hernández
1992
 Spain Road Race  Miguel Induráin
1995
 World Time Trial Miguel Induráin
1997
 British Road Race Jeremy Hunt
 Spain Road Race  José María Jiménez
1998
 World Time Trial Abraham Olano
2003
 Spain Road Race  Rubén Plaza
2004
 Spain Road Race  Francisco Mancebo
 Spain Time Trial José Iván Gutiérrez
2005
 Spain Time Trial José Iván Gutiérrez
2006
 France Road Race Florent Brard
2007
 Spain Road Race Joaquim Rodríguez
 Spain Time Trial José Iván Gutiérrez
2008
 Spain Road Race Alejandro Valverde
 Spain Time Trial Luis León Sánchez
2010
 Spain Road Race José Iván Gutiérrez
 Spain Time Trial Luis León Sánchez
 Portugal Time Trial Rui Costa
2011
 Spain Road Race José Joaquín Rojas
2012
 Spain Road Race Francisco Ventoso
 Belarus Time Trial Branislau Samoilau
2013
 British Time Trial Alex Dowsett
 Spain Time Trial Jonathan Castroviejo
 Portugal Time Trial Rui Costa
 Spain Road Race Jesús Herrada
 World Road Race Rui Costa
2014
 Spain Time Trial Alejandro Valverde
 Spain Road Race Ion Izagirre
 Italy Time Trial Adriano Malori
2015
 British Time Trial Alex Dowsett
 Italy Time Trial Adriano Malori
 Spain Time Trial Jonathan Castroviejo
 Spain Road Race Alejandro Valverde
2016
 British Time Trial Alex Dowsett
 Spain Time Trial Ion Izagirre
 Portugal Time Trial Nelson Oliveira
 Spain Road Race José Joaquín Rojas
 European Time Trial Jonathan Castroviejo
2017
 Spain Time Trial Jonathan Castroviejo
 Spain Road Race Jesús Herrada
2018
 World Road Race Alejandro Valverde
2019
 Spain Road Race Alejandro Valverde
2020
 European Track Championships (Madison) Sebastián Mora & Albert Torres
 European Track Championships (Points race) Sebastián Mora
2021
 Puerto Rico Time Trial Abner González
 Puerto Rico Road Race Abner González
2022
 Denmark Time Trial Mathias Norsgaard
 Brazil Under-23 Time Trial Vinícius Rangel
 Brazil Road Race Vinícius Rangel
 Puerto Rico Road Race Abner González

Former riders

See also

List of cycling teams in Spain

References

External links

 

 
Movistar
Cycling teams based in Spain
Cycling teams established in 1980
Telefónica
1980 establishments in Spain